Kelly Mendes (born 28 April 1997) is a Luxembourger footballer who plays as a midfielder. She is a member of the Luxembourg women's national team.

International career
Mendes capped for Luxembourg at senior level during the UEFA Women's Euro 2017 qualifying preliminary round, in a 0–2 loss to Lithuania on 6 April 2015.

See also
List of Luxembourg women's international footballers

References

1997 births
Living people
Women's association football midfielders
Luxembourgian women's footballers
Luxembourg women's international footballers
Luxembourgian people of Portuguese descent